Sphenomorphus fasciatus , the banded sphenomorphus, is a species of skink endemic to the Philippines.

Habitat and conservation
It is a common species occurring in dipterocarp and Babeee 
Habitat loss can be a local threat, but the overall population is not threatened; it occurs in many protected areas.

References

Lygosominae
Endemic fauna of the Philippines
Reptiles of the Philippines
Reptiles described in 1845
Taxa named by John Edward Gray